In mathematical invariant theory, a perpetuant is informally an irreducible covariant of a form or infinite degree. More precisely, the dimension of the space of irreducible covariants of given degree and weight for a binary form stabilizes provided the degree of the form is larger than the weight of the covariant, and the elements of this space are called perpetuants.

MacMahon conjectured and Stroh proved that the dimension of the space of  perpetuants of degree n>2 and weight w is the coefficient of xw of 

For n=1 there is just one perpetuant,  of weight 0, and for n=2 the number is given by the coefficient of xw of x2/(1-x2).

There are very few papers after about 1910 discussing perpetuants;  is one of the few exceptions.  exhibited an explicit base of the space of perpetuants.

References

Invariant theory